A Collection of Rare, Unreleased & Remastered is the compilation album by Mentallo & The Fixer, released on April 27, 2012 by Alfa Matrix.

Reception
In reviewing A Collection of Rare, Unreleased & Remastered, Peter Marks of Brutal Resonance criticized the music for not aging well but acknowledged that he preferred the albums Mentallo & The Fixer produced after Dwayne Dassing departed from the band. Lollipop Magazine stated "Texan electro-industrial act Mentallo & The Fixer has been at it for a while, and that knowledge shows on the lean, effective "decomposed (spent)." Peek-A-Boo Magazine criticized the collection for being excessive, saying "slimming it down to three or even two cd's would have been possible, maybe even with a few free downloads of remixes/reworked songs."

Track listing

Personnel
Adapted from the A Collection of Rare, Unreleased & Remastered liner notes.

Mentallo & The Fixer
 Dwayne Dassing (as The Fixer) – programming (1-4, 1–9, 1-13, 2–3, 3–9, 2–8, 4–4 to 4–5, 4–7, 4–10 to 4-11), remixer (2.7, 2.8, 3.7), recording (2.7, 2.8, 3.13), mixing (1.11, 1.13)
 Gary Dassing (as Mentallo) – programming (1.1-1.13, 2.1-2.7, 2.9-2.15, 3.1-3.8, 3.10-3.15, 4.1-4.3, 4.5-4.9, 4.12), mixing (1.1-1.10, 1.12, 2.1-2-15, 3.1-3.13, 4.1-4.3, 4.6, 4.8, 4.9, 4.12), engineering (1.1 to 1.13, 2.1 to 2.15, 3.1 to 3.13), recording (1.1-1.13, 2.1-2.6, 2.9, 2.10-2.15, 3.1-3.13), remastering (2.1-2.15, 3.1-3.13), editing (2.1-2.15, 3.1-3.13), vocals (3-4 to 3–5, 3-10, 3–14 to 3-15), remixer (2.8)

Additional performers
 John Bustamante – vocals (3.12)
 Michael Greene – vocals (3.6-3.9)
 Richard Mendez – instruments (4.1-4.12), vocals (3.11, 4.1-4.12)
 Larry Penn – vocals (3.13)
 Jon Pyre – vocals (3.1-3.3)

Release history

References

External links 
 
 A Collection of Rare, Unreleased & Remastered at Bandcamp
 Inner Sanctum at iTunes

2012 compilation albums
Mentallo & The Fixer albums
Alfa Matrix compilation albums